Stapleford may refer to:

Places

England
Stapleford, Cambridgeshire
Stapleford, Hampshire
Stapleford, Hertfordshire
Stapleford, Leicestershire
Stapleford Miniature Railway
Stapleford, Lincolnshire
Stapleford, Nottinghamshire
Stapleford Rural District
Stapleford, Wiltshire
Stapleford Abbotts, Essex
Stapleford Tawney, Essex
Stapleford Aerodrome

Elsewhere
Stapleford, Zimbabwe

People
 Harvey Stapleford (1912-1983), Canadian ice hockey player and coach
 Sally-Anne Stapleford (born 1945), English figure skater, administrator, referee and judge

See also
 Stableford (disambiguation)